Moisés Ribeiro Santos (born 3 March 1991), known as Moisés Ribeiro or simply Moisés, is a Brazilian footballer who plays for Chapecoense.

Club career
Born in Salvador, Bahia, Moisés started playing as a senior with Olaria, on loan from Corinthians. On 1 June 2012, he was presented at Bragantino.

Moisés subsequently represented Boa Esporte, Mogi Mirim, Linense and Sampaio Corrêa before signing with J2 League club Avispa Fukuoka on 21 July 2015. He only appeared in three matches for the club, with his debut being on 1 November in a 4–0 home routing of Yokohama FC.

On 18 December 2015 Moisés joined Série A club Chapecoense. He made his debut in the category on 1 June 2016, coming on as a second half substitute for Josimar in a 4–3 away win against Coritiba.

Moisés did not board LaMia Airlines Flight 2933 for the 2016 Copa Sudamericana Finals, which crashed and killed 19 of his teammates. He subsequently became a starter for the club in the 2017 season, but was suspended for two years in August 2018 after testing positive for the use of corticosteroids in a Copa Libertadores match.

In February 2020, shortly after serving his ban, Moisés suffered a knee injury which sidelined him for the most of the 2020 campaign. He only returned to action in February 2021, in a Recopa Catarinense match.

Career statistics

Honours
Chapecoense
Campeonato Catarinense: 2016, 2017

References

External links
 
 

1991 births
Living people
Sportspeople from Salvador, Bahia
Brazilian footballers
Association football midfielders
Campeonato Brasileiro Série A players
Campeonato Brasileiro Série B players
Campeonato Brasileiro Série C players
Associação Portuguesa de Desportos players
Olaria Atlético Clube players
Clube Atlético Bragantino players
Boa Esporte Clube players
Mogi Mirim Esporte Clube players
Clube Atlético Linense players
Sampaio Corrêa Futebol Clube players
Associação Chapecoense de Futebol players
J2 League players
Avispa Fukuoka players
Brazilian expatriate footballers
Brazilian expatriate sportspeople in Japan
Expatriate footballers in Japan
Doping cases in association football